Kareem Jackson (born April 10, 1988) is an American football strong safety for the National Football League (NFL). He played college football at Alabama. He was drafted by the Houston Texans in the first round of the 2010 NFL Draft.

High school career
Jackson attended Westside High School. As a senior, he mainly played running back and compiled 1,436 rushing yards with 20 touchdowns and nine receptions for 256 yards with two receiving touchdowns.

Following high school, Jackson attended Fork Union Military Academy, where he converted from running back to cornerback.

Considered a four-star recruit by Rivals.com, Jackson was listed as the No. 17 prep school prospect in 2007.

College career
As a true freshman, Jackson started in 12 of 13 games for the Crimson Tide. He ranked second on the team with three interceptions on the season and was fourth with four pass breakups. Jackson recorded 66 tackles on the season, good for fifth-best on the team. He subsequently received Freshman All-American honors.

Jackson was eighth on the team in tackles with 44, including 28 solo stops, as a sophomore in 2008. He registered ten pass breakups on the year with one interception.

As a junior in 2009, Jackson started in all 14 games and was fifth on the team with 49 tackles. He had one interception and broke up 13 passes during the 2009 season.

On January 15, 2010, Jackson declared he would forgo his senior season and enter the NFL Draft.

Professional career
Coming out of Alabama, Jackson was invited to the NFL Combine and completed the entire workout and all required drills. He was satisfied with his combine performance and chose to only partake in positional drills at Alabama's Pro Day. After he performed well, he was projected by the majority of analysts and scouts to be drafted in the first or second round. In a deep cornerback draft, he was ranked the fifth best cornerback and 32nd overall prospect by NFLDraftScout.com. He was listed as the fourth best cornerback on WalterFootball.com's scouting report. Sports Illustrated also listed him as the fourth best cornerback in the draft, behind Joe Haden, Kyle Wilson, and Devin McCourty.

Houston Texans

2010
The Houston Texans drafted Jackson in the first round (20th overall) of the 2010 NFL Draft. He was the second cornerback taken in 2010, behind Florida's Joe Haden (7th overall).

On July 30, 2010, the Houston Texans signed him to a five-year, $13.52 million contract that includes $7.36 million guaranteed and a signing bonus of $875,500.

Jackson entered his rookie training camp as the starting right cornerback opposite veteran Glover Quin. Jackson made his professional regular season debut in the Houston Texans' season-opener against the Indianapolis Colts and recorded four solo tackles and a pass deflection in the 34–24 victory. On October 10, 2010, he recorded five solo tackles and his first career interception off of Eli Manning, returning it for 23-yards in the 34–10 loss to the New York Giants. The following week, Jackson racked up a season-high seven combined tackles in a 35-32 win over the Kansas City Chiefs. In a Week 9 matchup against the San Diego Chargers, he made six combined tackles and intercepted Philip Rivers in a 29-23 loss. On December 13, 2010, he had a season-high six solo tackles and an assisted tackle in a 34-28 loss to the Baltimore Ravens. Jackson finished his rookie season with  a career-high 71 combined tackles, 10 pass deflections, and two interceptions while starting all 16 regular season games. The Texans finished 6–10 and was ranked last in the league in passing defense. Football Outsiders ranked him 68th (47%) in success rating and PFF gave him a -10.3 in pass coverage. His average QB rating for opposing quarterbacks was 111.8.

2011

Jackson entered training camp in 2011 competing with Johnathan Joseph, Jason Allen, and Brice McCain to keep the starting cornerback position. New defensive coordinator Wade Phillips named Jackson the left cornerback to start the regular season opposite Joseph.

Jackson started the Houston Texans' season opener against the Indianapolis Colts and made one tackle as the Texans routed the Colts, 34–7. The following week, he was demoted to backup as Jason Allen was given the start. During this time Allen showed good coverage, played well, and made a game-sealing interception in a 17-10 victory over the Pittsburgh Steelers in Week 4, which Jackson was inactive for. However, he reclaimed his starting position in Week 6. He finished the game with four solo tackles in a 29-14 loss to the Baltimore Ravens. On November 6, 2011, Jackson recorded a season-high six solo tackles and a pass deflection in a 30-12 victory over the Cleveland Browns. On December 4, 2011, he made three solo tackles and two pass reflections, and intercepted Matt Ryan for his first and only interception of the season in a 17-10 win over the Atlanta Falcons. He finished with 42 combined tackles (37 solo), a forced fumble, an interception, and six deflected passes in 15 games and 13 starts.

The Houston Texans finished the 2011 season with a 10-6 record and received a playoff berth. On January 7, 2012, Jackson appeared in his first career postseason game and made four combined tackles in a 31–10 victory over the Cincinnati Bengals in the AFC Wildcard Game. The next game, he recorded four solo tackles and deflected a pass in a 20–13 loss to the Baltimore Ravens in the divisional playoff game. Jackson received a coverage rating of -9.5 from PFF and was ranked 67th (45%) in success rate among qualified corners by Football Outsiders.

2012
Jackson entered the 2012 season slated as the starting cornerback along with Johnathan Joseph. He started the Houston Texans' season opener against the Miami Dolphins and finished the 30–10 victory with five combined tackles, two pass deflections, and intercepted Ryan Tannehill's pass after it was tipped by J. J. Watt. On September 23, 2012, Jackson recorded a season-high seven solo tackles, an assisted tackle, and a deflected a pass in a 31–25 win over the Denver Broncos. The next week, he made two solo tackles, deflected two passes, and intercepted Tennessee Titans' quarterback Matt Hasselbeck and returned it 63 yards for his first career touchdown as the Texans routed the Titans, 38–14.

In Week 5, he had one tackle and intercepted a Mark Sanchez pass in a 23–17 defeat over the New York Jets. It was Jackson's first time with back-to-back interceptions in two consecutive games. On December 30, 2012, he had a season-high eight combined tackles and a pass deflection in a 28–16 loss to the Indianapolis Colts. He finished the 2012 regular season with 53 combined tackles (47 solo), a career-high 16 pass deflections, a career-high four interceptions, and a touchdown in 16 games and 15 starts. The Houston Texans finished first in the AFC South with a 12-4 record but were eliminated from the playoffs after losing to the New England Patriots in the Divisional round.

Jackson had his best statistical season of his career in 2012. In comparison, Johnathan Joseph was named to the Pro Bowl although he had only five more combined tackles than Jackson and had two interceptions to Jackson's four. He was ranked the seventh-best cornerback in coverage rating (+13.4) according to Pro Football Focus. Football Outsiders Almanac 2013 ranked him twelfth in success rate (59%) among all qualified cornerbacks and the QB rating for opposing quarterbacks targeting Jackson was an average of 69.6.

2013
Jackson and Joseph returned in 2013 as the Houston Texans starting cornerback duo. He started the season off with three solo tackles in the Texans' season-opening 31–28 victory over the San Diego Chargers. The following game, Jackson recorded a season-high six solo tackles and made two pass deflections in a 30–24 win against the Tennessee Titans. During the third quarter, Jackson was flagged for unnecessary roughness after hitting Titans' receiver Kendall Wright, who was deemed a defenseless receiver at the time. Three days later, the NFL fined him $42,000 for the hit, as it was deemed "dirty", and Wright was diagnosed with a concussion. He missed Weeks 11 and 12 after suffering a fractured rib that limited his ability to play.

Jackson finished the season with 56 combined tackles and nine deflected passes in 14 starts and 14 games. PFF gave him a -4.3 pass coverage grade and he allowed a 106.1 QBR. He was ranked 81st (42%) in success rate by Football Outsiders. The Houston Texans finished the season with a 2–14 record and head coach Gary Kubiak was fired in Week 15.

2014
Jackson started the 2014 season-opener against the Washington Redskins and made eight combined Tackles in the 17-6 victory. The next week, Jackson made two solo tackles and intercepted rookie quarterback Derek Carr and returned it for 65 yards in a 30–14 victory over the Oakland Raiders. On October 5, 2014, he recorded a season-high nine combined tackles during a 20–17 loss to the Dallas Cowboys. On December 21, 2014, Jackson made one solo tackle and intercepted Baltimore Ravens' quarterback Joe Flacco two times as the Texans defeated the Ravens, 25–13. He finished his first season under new head coach Bill O'Brien with 56 combined (46 solo) tackles, nine pass deflections, and three interceptions in 13 games and 13 starts.

2015
Jackson became an unrestricted free agent during the 2015 off-season and was one of the top free agent cornerbacks.

On March 7, 2015, the Houston Texans signed Jackson to a four-year, $34 million contract with $20 million guaranteed and a signing bonus of $9 million.

Entering training camp he faced competition from first-round rookie draft pick Kevin Johnson, but Jackson and Joseph were able to maintain their starting roles entering the regular season. He started the Texans' season-opener and made six solo tackles in a 27–20 loss to the Kansas City Chiefs. On October 18, 2015, Jackson made one solo tackle and left in the second quarter of the 31-20 victory over the Jacksonville Jaguars and did not return. He missed the next four games with an ankle injury. On November 29, 2015, he made his return and made four combined tackles, a pass deflection, and intercepted New Orleans Saint's quarterback Drew Brees in a 24-6 victory. In Week 14, Jackson racked up a season-high nine solo tackles and a pass deflection in a 27-6 loss to the New England Patriots. On January 3. 2016, he made three solo tackles, intercepted Blake Bortles, and returned it for a 27-yard game-sealing touchdown as the Texans routed the Jaguars 30-6. He finished the season with 58 combined tackles (52 solo), six pass deflections, two interceptions, and a touchdown in 10 starts and 12 games.

The Houston Texans finished with a 9-7 record and finished first in the AFC South. In the AFC Wildcard game, Jackson made seven combined tackles and deflected a pass as they lost to the Kansas City Chiefs 30–0.

2016
He held onto his starting role, along with Johnathan Joseph, to begin the 2016 regular season. Jackson started the season-opener and made five combined tackles in a 23–14 win against the Chicago Bears. He missed Weeks 5 and 6 with a hamstring injury. On November 13, 2016, Jackson recorded six solo tackles and intercepted Blake Bortles, returning it for a 42-yard touchdown in a 24–21 victory over the Jacksonville Jaguars. This was his second consecutive season with an interception for a return of a touchdown off of Bortles. During a Week 14 matchup against the Indianapolis Colts, Jackson made a season-high eight combined tackles in a 22–17 victory. He finished the season with 62 combined tackles (51 solo), four pass deflections, an interception, and a touchdown in 13 starts and 14 games.

After finishing first in the AFC South with a 9–7 record, Jackson made four combined tackles in a 27–14 Wild Card Round victory over the Oakland Raiders.

2017
Throughout training camp, Jackson faced stiff competition from Kevin Johnson. He was ultimately surpassed on the depth chart and was named the Houston Texans' slot cornerback begin the regular season, behind starting outside cornerbacks Kevin Johnson and Johnathan Joseph.

During the Houston Texans' 7–29 season-opening loss to the Jacksonville Jaguars, Jackson recorded six combined tackles. On September 14, Jackson caused rookie Cincinnati Bengals' wide receiver John Ross to fumble, which teammate Jadeveon Clowney recovered and returned for 49 yards to set up the Texans' offense on a field goal scoring drive. He was thrown into the starting lineup after Johnathan Joseph left during the second quarter with a shoulder injury and Kevin Johnson left after suffering a MCL sprain. Jackson led the Texans with seven combined tackles and had his first career sack on Bengals' quarterback Andy Dalton. Jackson remained a starter, in the absence of Kevin Johnson, who was out for four-six weeks.

2018
In the offseason following organized team activities, head coach Bill O'Brien announced that Jackson would be moved to free safety full time. The move was made after Jackson's struggles at cornerback the previous season and starter Andre Hal was diagnosed with Hodgkin's lymphoma. Despite this statement, Jackson started all 16 games at cornerback in 2018.

Denver Broncos

2019
On March 13, 2019, Jackson signed a three-year $33 million deal with the Denver Broncos.
In week 6 against the Tennessee Titans, Jackson recorded an interception off Ryan Tannehill in the 16–0 win.  This was his first interception of the season and as a member of the Broncos.
In week 14 against his former team, the Houston Texans, Jackson recorded 11 tackles, intercepted a pass thrown by Deshaun Watson, received a lateral from teammate Jeremiah Attaochu who recovered a fumble lost by Keke Coutee and returned the ball for a 70 yard touchdown during the 38–24 win, earning him AFC Defensive Player of the Week. On December 17, 2019, Jackson was suspended for the final two games of the 2019 season. The suspension stemmed from a September arrest for DUI. He was reinstated from suspension on December 30, 2019.

2020
In Week 17 against the Las Vegas Raiders, Jackson recovered a fumble lost by Darren Waller and later intercepted a pass thrown by Derek Carr during the 32–31 loss.

2021
On March 17, 2021, the Broncos declined the option on Jackson's contract, making him an unrestricted free agent. On March 24, 2021, Jackson signed a one-year, $5 million contract with the Broncos.

2022
On April 11, 2022, Jackson signed a one-year deal with the Broncos.

NFL career statistics

References

External links
Kareem Jackson Official Website
Houston Texans bio
Alabama Crimson Tide bio

1988 births
Living people
Players of American football from Georgia (U.S. state)
Sportspeople from Macon, Georgia
American football cornerbacks
Alabama Crimson Tide football players
Houston Texans players
Denver Broncos players